Pavlovka is the name of several inhabited localities in Russia.

Altai Krai
As of 2010, five rural localities in Altai Krai bear this name:
Pavlovka, Slavgorod, Altai Krai, a selo under the administrative jurisdiction of the town of krai significance of Slavgorod
Pavlovka, Bayevsky District, Altai Krai, a selo in Nizhnechumansky Selsoviet of Bayevsky District
Pavlovka, Loktevsky District, Altai Krai, a selo in Alexandrovsky Selsoviet of Loktevsky District
Pavlovka, Novichikhinsky District, Altai Krai, a selo in Solonovsky Selsoviet of Novichikhinsky District
Pavlovka, Uglovsky District, Altai Krai, a selo in Pavlovsky Selsoviet of Uglovsky District

Amur Oblast
As of 2010, two rural localities in Amur Oblast bear this name:
Pavlovka, Belogorsky District, Amur Oblast, a selo in Vasilyevsky Rural Settlement of Belogorsky District
Pavlovka, Seryshevsky District, Amur Oblast, a selo in Lermontovsky Rural Settlement of Seryshevsky District

Republic of Bashkortostan
As of 2010, five rural localities in the Republic of Bashkortostan bear this name:
Pavlovka, Bizhbulyaksky District, Republic of Bashkortostan, a village in Sukhorechensky Selsoviet of Bizhbulyaksky District
Pavlovka, Gafuriysky District, Republic of Bashkortostan, a village in Tabynsky Selsoviet of Gafuriysky District
Pavlovka, Ishimbaysky District, Republic of Bashkortostan, a village in Petrovsky Selsoviet of Ishimbaysky District
Pavlovka, Kuyurgazinsky District, Republic of Bashkortostan, a village in Krivle-Ilyushkinsky Selsoviet of Kuyurgazinsky District
Pavlovka, Nurimanovsky District, Republic of Bashkortostan, a selo in Pavlovsky Selsoviet of Nurimanovsky District

Belgorod Oblast
As of 2010, three rural localities in Belgorod Oblast bear this name:
Pavlovka, Chernyansky District, Belgorod Oblast, a selo in Chernyansky District
Pavlovka, Korochansky District, Belgorod Oblast, a selo in Korochansky District
Pavlovka, Valuysky District, Belgorod Oblast, a khutor in Biryuchansky Rural Okrug of Valuysky District

Bryansk Oblast
As of 2013, three rural localities in Bryansk Oblast bear this name:
Pavlovka, Unechsky District, Bryansk Oblast, a selo in Pavlovsky Selsoviet of Unechsky District
Pavlovka, Vygonichsky District, Bryansk Oblast, a village in Utynsky Selsoviet of Vygonichsky District
Pavlovka, Zlynkovsky District, Bryansk Oblast, a settlement under the administrative jurisdiction of Zlynka Urban Administrative Okrug of Zlynkovsky District

Irkutsk Oblast
As of 2010, one rural locality in Irkutsk Oblast bears this name:
Pavlovka, Irkutsk Oblast, a village in Tulunsky District

Kaluga Oblast
As of 2010, five rural localities in Kaluga Oblast bear this name:
Pavlovka, Duminichsky District, Kaluga Oblast, a village in Duminichsky District
Pavlovka, Khvastovichsky District, Kaluga Oblast, a village in Khvastovichsky District
Pavlovka, Maloyaroslavetsky District, Kaluga Oblast, a village in Maloyaroslavetsky District
Pavlovka, Zhizdrinsky District, Kaluga Oblast, a village in Zhizdrinsky District
Pavlovka, Zhukovsky District, Kaluga Oblast, a village in Zhukovsky District

Kemerovo Oblast
As of 2010, one rural locality in Kemerovo Oblast bears this name:
Pavlovka, Kemerovo Oblast, a settlement in Podgornovskaya Rural Territory of Leninsk-Kuznetsky District

Krasnoyarsk Krai
As of 2010, four rural localities in Krasnoyarsk Krai bear this name:
Pavlovka, Bogotolsky District, Krasnoyarsk Krai, a village in Vaginsky Selsoviet of Bogotolsky District
Pavlovka, Nazarovsky District, Krasnoyarsk Krai, a selo in Pavlovsky Selsoviet of Nazarovsky District
Pavlovka, Nizhneingashsky District, Krasnoyarsk Krai, a village in Pavlovsky Selsoviet of Nizhneingashsky District
Pavlovka, Sayansky District, Krasnoyarsk Krai, a village in Aginsky Selsoviet of Sayansky District

Kursk Oblast
As of 2010, seven rural localities in Kursk Oblast bear this name:
Pavlovka, Fatezhsky District, Kursk Oblast, a khutor in Soldatsky Selsoviet of Fatezhsky District
Pavlovka, Konyshyovsky District, Kursk Oblast, a village in Glazovsky Selsoviet of Konyshyovsky District
Pavlovka, Kurchatovsky District, Kursk Oblast, a village in Kolpakovsky Selsoviet of Kurchatovsky District
Pavlovka, Oboyansky District, Kursk Oblast, a selo in Pavlovsky Selsoviet of Oboyansky District
Pavlovka, Pristensky District, Kursk Oblast, a khutor in Verkhneploskovsky Selsoviet of Pristensky District
Pavlovka, Rylsky District, Kursk Oblast, a village in Durovsky Selsoviet of Rylsky District
Pavlovka, Sovetsky District, Kursk Oblast, a village in Natalyinsky Selsoviet of Sovetsky District

Lipetsk Oblast
As of 2010, four rural localities in Lipetsk Oblast bear this name:
Pavlovka, Dankovsky District, Lipetsk Oblast, a village in Perekhvalsky Selsoviet of Dankovsky District
Pavlovka, Dobrinsky District, Lipetsk Oblast, a selo in Pavlovsky Selsoviet of Dobrinsky District
Pavlovka, Izmalkovsky District, Lipetsk Oblast, a village in Preobrazhensky Selsoviet of Izmalkovsky District
Pavlovka, Zadonsky District, Lipetsk Oblast, a village in Khmelinetsky Selsoviet of Zadonsky District

Republic of Mordovia
As of 2010, five rural localities in the Republic of Mordovia bear this name:
Pavlovka, Atyuryevsky District, Republic of Mordovia, a village in Novochadovsky Selsoviet of Atyuryevsky District
Pavlovka, Ichalkovsky District, Republic of Mordovia, a settlement in Obrochinsky Selsoviet of Ichalkovsky District
Pavlovka, Lyambirsky District, Republic of Mordovia, a selo in Skryabinsky Selsoviet of Lyambirsky District
Pavlovka, Staroshaygovsky District, Republic of Mordovia, a village in Bogdanovsky Selsoviet of Staroshaygovsky District
Pavlovka, Temnikovsky District, Republic of Mordovia, a village in Zhegalovsky Selsoviet of Temnikovsky District

Nizhny Novgorod Oblast
As of 2010, three rural localities in Nizhny Novgorod Oblast bear this name:
Pavlovka, Bolsheboldinsky District, Nizhny Novgorod Oblast, a settlement in Pikshensky Selsoviet of Bolsheboldinsky District
Pavlovka, Perevozsky District, Nizhny Novgorod Oblast, a village in Paletsky Selsoviet of Perevozsky District
Pavlovka, Sergachsky District, Nizhny Novgorod Oblast, a village in Lopatinsky Selsoviet of Sergachsky District

Novgorod Oblast
As of 2010, one rural locality in Novgorod Oblast bears this name:
Pavlovka, Novgorod Oblast, a village in Zhelezkovskoye Settlement of Borovichsky District

Novosibirsk Oblast
As of 2010, three rural localities in Novosibirsk Oblast bear this name:
Pavlovka, Chistoozyorny District, Novosibirsk Oblast, a selo in Chistoozyorny District
Pavlovka, Karasuksky District, Novosibirsk Oblast, a village in Karasuksky District
Pavlovka, Kuybyshevsky District, Novosibirsk Oblast, a village in Kuybyshevsky District

Omsk Oblast
As of 2010, four rural localities in Omsk Oblast bear this name:
Pavlovka, Muromtsevsky District, Omsk Oblast, a village under the administrative jurisdiction of the work settlement of Muromtsevo in Muromtsevsky District
Pavlovka, Okoneshnikovsky District, Omsk Oblast, a village in Sergeyevsky Rural Okrug of Okoneshnikovsky District
Pavlovka, Sargatsky District, Omsk Oblast, a village in Bazhenovsky Rural Okrug of Sargatsky District
Pavlovka, Sedelnikovsky District, Omsk Oblast, a village in Golubovsky Rural Okrug of Sedelnikovsky District

Orenburg Oblast
As of 2010, two rural localities in Orenburg Oblast bear this name:
Pavlovka, Orenburgsky District, Orenburg Oblast, a selo in Podgorodne-Pokrovsky Selsoviet of Orenburgsky District
Pavlovka, Severny District, Orenburg Oblast, a village in Kamennogorsky Selsoviet of Severny District

Oryol Oblast
As of 2010, three rural localities in Oryol Oblast bear this name:
Pavlovka, Kolpnyansky District, Oryol Oblast, a village in Ushakovsky Selsoviet of Kolpnyansky District
Pavlovka, Krasnozorensky District, Oryol Oblast, a village in Krasnozorensky Selsoviet of Krasnozorensky District
Pavlovka, Maloarkhangelsky District, Oryol Oblast, a village in Podgorodnensky Selsoviet of Maloarkhangelsky District

Penza Oblast
As of 2010, two rural localities in Penza Oblast bear this name:
Pavlovka, Nikolsky District, Penza Oblast, a selo in Maissky Selsoviet of Nikolsky District
Pavlovka, Tamalinsky District, Penza Oblast, a settlement in Ulyanovsky Selsoviet of Tamalinsky District

Perm Krai
As of 2010, one rural locality in Perm Krai bears this name:
Pavlovka, Perm Krai, a selo in Chernushinsky District

Primorsky Krai
As of 2010, two rural localities in Primorsky Krai bear this name:
Pavlovka, Chuguyevsky District, Primorsky Krai, a selo in Chuguyevsky District
Pavlovka, Mikhaylovsky District, Primorsky Krai, a selo in Mikhaylovsky District

Rostov Oblast
As of 2010, five rural localities in Rostov Oblast bear this name:
Pavlovka, Azovsky District, Rostov Oblast, a khutor in Novoalexandrovskoye Rural Settlement of Azovsky District
Pavlovka, Chertkovsky District, Rostov Oblast, a khutor in Olkhovchanskoye Rural Settlement of Chertkovsky District
Pavlovka, Krasnosulinsky District, Rostov Oblast, a selo in Kiselevskoye Rural Settlement of Krasnosulinsky District
Pavlovka, Milyutinsky District, Rostov Oblast, a khutor in Mankovo-Berezovskoye Rural Settlement of Milyutinsky District
Pavlovka, Tarasovsky District, Rostov Oblast, a khutor in Yefremovo-Stepanovskoye Rural Settlement of Tarasovsky District

Ryazan Oblast
As of 2010, nine rural localities in Ryazan Oblast bear this name:
Pavlovka, Nikitinsky Rural Okrug, Korablinsky District, Ryazan Oblast, a village in Nikitinsky Rural Okrug of Korablinsky District
Pavlovka, Nikolayevsky Rural Okrug, Korablinsky District, Ryazan Oblast, a village in Nikolayevsky Rural Okrug of Korablinsky District
Pavlovka, Mikhaylovsky District, Ryazan Oblast, a village in Zhmurovsky Rural Okrug of Mikhaylovsky District
Pavlovka, Alexandro-Nevsky District, Ryazan Oblast, a village in Pavlovsky Rural Okrug of Alexandro-Nevsky District
Pavlovka, Putyatinsky District, Ryazan Oblast, a settlement in Beregovskoy Rural Okrug of Putyatinsky District
Pavlovka, Ryazansky District, Ryazan Oblast, a village in Vyshetravinsky Rural Okrug of Ryazansky District
Pavlovka, Sarayevsky District, Ryazan Oblast, a village in Bogolyubovsky Rural Okrug of Sarayevsky District
Pavlovka, Shilovsky District, Ryazan Oblast, a village in Zanino-Pochinkovsky Rural Okrug of Shilovsky District
Pavlovka, Spassky District, Ryazan Oblast, a settlement in Kiritsky Rural Okrug of Spassky District

Samara Oblast
As of 2010, five rural localities in Samara Oblast bear this name:
Pavlovka, Alexeyevsky District, Samara Oblast, a selo in Alexeyevsky District
Pavlovka, Kinelsky District, Samara Oblast, a selo in Kinelsky District
Pavlovka, Krasnoarmeysky District, Samara Oblast, a selo in Krasnoarmeysky District
Pavlovka, Sergiyevsky District, Samara Oblast, a selo in Sergiyevsky District
Pavlovka, Yelkhovsky District, Samara Oblast, a village in Yelkhovsky District

Saratov Oblast
As of 2010, six rural localities in Saratov Oblast bear this name:
Pavlovka, Atkarsky District, Saratov Oblast, a village in Atkarsky District
Pavlovka (Privolzhskoye Rural Settlement), Marksovsky District, Saratov Oblast, a selo in Marksovsky District; municipally, a part of Privolzhskoye Rural Settlement of that district
Pavlovka (Podlesnovskoye Rural Settlement), Marksovsky District, Saratov Oblast, a selo in Marksovsky District; municipally, a part of Podlesnovskoye Rural Settlement of that district
Pavlovka, Petrovsky District, Saratov Oblast, a village in Petrovsky District
Pavlovka, Turkovsky District, Saratov Oblast, a village in Turkovsky District
Pavlovka, Yekaterinovsky District, Saratov Oblast, a village in Yekaterinovsky District

Smolensk Oblast
As of 2010, two rural localities in Smolensk Oblast bear this name:
Pavlovka, Gryazenyatskoye Rural Settlement, Roslavlsky District, Smolensk Oblast, a village in Gryazenyatskoye Rural Settlement of Roslavlsky District
Pavlovka, Osterskoye Rural Settlement, Roslavlsky District, Smolensk Oblast, a village in Osterskoye Rural Settlement of Roslavlsky District

Stavropol Krai
As of 2010, one rural locality in Stavropol Krai bears this name:
Pavlovka, Stavropol Krai, a khutor in Vodorazdelny Selsoviet of Andropovsky District

Tambov Oblast
As of 2010, fourteen rural localities in Tambov Oblast bear this name:
Pavlovka, Bondarsky District, Tambov Oblast, a village in Kershinsky Selsoviet of Bondarsky District
Pavlovka, Kondaurovsky Selsoviet, Gavrilovsky District, Tambov Oblast, a village in Kondaurovsky Selsoviet of Gavrilovsky District
Pavlovka, Osino-Gaysky Selsoviet, Gavrilovsky District, Tambov Oblast, a village in Osino-Gaysky Selsoviet of Gavrilovsky District
Pavlovka, Inzhavinsky District, Tambov Oblast, a selo in Mikhaylovsky Selsoviet of Inzhavinsky District
Pavlovka, Mordovsky District, Tambov Oblast, a selo in Leninsky Selsoviet of Mordovsky District
Pavlovka, Petrovsky District, Tambov Oblast, a village in Petrovsky Selsoviet of Petrovsky District
Pavlovka, Rzhaksinsky District, Tambov Oblast, a village in Lukinsky Selsoviet of Rzhaksinsky District
Pavlovka, Sampursky District, Tambov Oblast, a village in Sampursky Selsoviet of Sampursky District
Pavlovka, Abakumovsky Selsoviet, Tokaryovsky District, Tambov Oblast, a village in Abakumovsky Selsoviet of Tokaryovsky District
Pavlovka, Abakumovsky Selsoviet, Tokaryovsky District, Tambov Oblast, a village in Abakumovsky Selsoviet of Tokaryovsky District
Pavlovka, Poletayevsky Selsoviet, Tokaryovsky District, Tambov Oblast, a selo in Poletayevsky Selsoviet of Tokaryovsky District
Pavlovka, Vasilyevsky Selsoviet, Tokaryovsky District, Tambov Oblast, a village in Vasilyevsky Selsoviet of Tokaryovsky District
Pavlovka, Umyotsky District, Tambov Oblast, a village under the administrative jurisdiction of Umyotsky Settlement Council of Umyotsky District
Pavlovka, Uvarovsky District, Tambov Oblast, a village in Pavlodarsky Selsoviet of Uvarovsky District

Republic of Tatarstan
As of 2010, one rural locality in the Republic of Tatarstan bears this name:
Pavlovka, Republic of Tatarstan, a village in Cheremshansky District

Tula Oblast
As of 2010, ten rural localities in Tula Oblast bear this name:
Pavlovka, Aleksinsky District, Tula Oblast, a village in Alexandrovsky Rural Okrug of Aleksinsky District
Pavlovka, Bogoroditsky District, Tula Oblast, a village in Tovarkovsky Rural Okrug of Bogoroditsky District
Pavlovka, Kamensky District, Tula Oblast, a village in Arkhangelsky Rural Okrug of Kamensky District
Pavlovka, Kimovsky District, Tula Oblast, a village in Buchalsky Rural Okrug of Kimovsky District
Pavlovka, Kurkinsky District, Tula Oblast, a village in Samarskaya Volost of Kurkinsky District
Pavlovka, Odoyevsky District, Tula Oblast, a village in Okorokovskaya Rural Administration of Odoyevsky District
Pavlovka, Plavsky District, Tula Oblast, a village in Novo-Nikolsky Rural Okrug of Plavsky District
Pavlovka, Suvorovsky District, Tula Oblast, a village in Zhelobinskaya Rural Territory of Suvorovsky District
Pavlovka, Tyoplo-Ogaryovsky District, Tula Oblast, a village in Severny Rural Okrug of Tyoplo-Ogaryovsky District
Pavlovka, Venyovsky District, Tula Oblast, a village in Mordvessky Rural Okrug of Venyovsky District

Tver Oblast
As of 2010, one rural locality in Tver Oblast bears this name:
Pavlovka, Tver Oblast, a village in Vasilkovskoye Rural Settlement of Kuvshinovsky District

Ulyanovsk Oblast
As of 2010, two inhabited localities in Ulyanovsk Oblast bear this name:
Pavlovka, Pavlovsky District, Ulyanovsk Oblast, a work settlement under the administrative jurisdiction of Pavlovsky Settlement Okrug of Pavlovsky District
Pavlovka, Baryshsky District, Ulyanovsk Oblast, a selo under the administrative jurisdiction of Zhadovsky Settlement Okrug of Baryshsky District

Vladimir Oblast
As of 2010, two rural localities in Vladimir Oblast bear this name:
Pavlovka, Kolchuginsky District, Vladimir Oblast, a village in Kolchuginsky District
Pavlovka, Sudogodsky District, Vladimir Oblast, a village in Sudogodsky District

Voronezh Oblast
As of 2010, four rural localities in Voronezh Oblast bear this name:
Pavlovka, Bobrovsky District, Voronezh Oblast, a selo in Semeno-Alexandrovskoye Rural Settlement of Bobrovsky District
Pavlovka, Paninsky District, Voronezh Oblast, a settlement in Krasnolimanskoye Rural Settlement of Paninsky District
Pavlovka, Ramonsky District, Voronezh Oblast, a selo in Pavlovskoye Rural Settlement of Ramonsky District
Pavlovka, Rossoshansky District, Voronezh Oblast, a khutor in Aleynikovskoye Rural Settlement of Rossoshansky District

Yaroslavl Oblast
As of 2010, one rural locality in Yaroslavl Oblast bears this name:
Pavlovka, Yaroslavl Oblast, a village in Pigalevsky Rural Okrug of Lyubimsky District